Jayati Chakraborty is a Bengali Indian exponent of Rabindra Sangeet and Bengali   songs. She has worked as a playback singer in Bengali cinema.

Partial albums 
She has released many albums, such as:

 Durer Pari
 Kagojer Nouka
 Tomaro Ashime
 E Hridoy
 Akasher Nir
 Ke Jabi
 Komal Gandhar (2015)
 Folk Lok (2016)
 Ebong Jayati (2018)
 Best of Jayati Chakraborty (2019)

Partial filmography 

 Bye Bye Bangkok (2011)
 Mrs. Sen (2013)
 Aamar Aami (2014)
 Bodhon (2015)
 Jogajog (2015)
 Tagore's Natir Puja: The Court Dancer (2016)
 Bilu Rakkhosh (2017)
 Bhootchakra Pvt. Ltd. (2019)
 Jyeshthoputro (2019)

See also 
 List of Indian playback singers

References

External links 
 Jayati Chakraborty IMDb
 Jayati Chakraborty gaana.com

21st-century Indian women singers
21st-century Indian singers
Rabindra Sangeet exponents
Bengali playback singers
Year of birth missing (living people)
Living people
Women musicians from West Bengal